Cuscuta japonica, commonly known as Japanese dodder, is a parasitic vine. It has been listed by the State of California as a noxious weed. It has a range of effects on its host and has repeatedly been introduced to the United States of America.  C. japonica looks very similar to other vines, making it difficult to distinguish.

Effects on host
The Japanese dodder is a plant that parasitizes other plants.  From mild development issues to serious complications sometimes resulting in death, the Japanese dodder can cause a wide spectrum of effects on its plant host. Farmers in particular can be affected by this plant, as infection leads to less crops they are able to harvest.

Morphology
Cuscuta japonica shares a similar morphology to vines, displaying stems that are mostly yellow with bits of red along it. The Japanese dodder also exhibits small flowers that are "pale-yellow to cream" in color and contain one circular stigma. Any leaves it has are very small and "scale-like" in shape and texture.  Fruit produced are small and capsule-like, only carrying a couple of seeds.

History
Cuscuta japonica can be found non-invasively in a variety of places on the continent of Asia. The plant was introduced and reintroduced to the United States of America multiple times starting from the 1940s under the guise of a medicinal plant, and was thought to have been eradicated a couple of times.

References

japonica
Plants described in 1854
Taxa named by Jacques Denys Choisy